Gabriela Duarte Franco (born 15 April 1974) is a Brazilian actress. She is also the daughter of actress Regina Duarte.

Biography 

She is the daughter of actress Regina Duarte and businessman Marcos Flávio Cunha Franco.

Career 

Her first work was the film O Cangaceiro Trapalhão, from 1983. She worked in the film O Vestido, which won her the award for Best Actress at the Festival de Cinema Ibero-Americano de Huelva.

She debuted on television in 1989, the miniseries Colônia Cecília. After being part of Top Model, her first soap opera, she participated in the remake of Irmãos Coragem, in 1995 in which she played the character played by her mother Regina Duarte on the first version. A year later, she participated in two episodes of the series A Vida Como Ela É, based on the work of Nelson Rodrigues.

In 1997, she gained widespread visibility in the soap opera Por Amor, where she played Maria Eduarda, a character who has generated controversy. Many disliked her interpretation, and was even created a website in the spirit "I hate Eduarda".

In the miniseries Chiquinha Gonzaga in 1999, she played the composer as a young man and her mother, Regina Duarte, played the same character at maturity. After a brief hiatus in her career, consisting only made investments in soap operas and series, in 2005 in América acts in the role of Simone, a veterinarian who engages with the protagonist of the story.

In 2007, operates in Sete Pecados, which gets some recognition of the public with the character Miriam, a public school principal who struggles against racial and social prejudices and believes in the improvement of public education.

In 2008, the actress makes an appearance on the show Casos e Acasos (Globo). The following year, participates in the microarray Acampamento de Férias, Renato Aragão, displayed by Rede Globo.

After three years of small roles in serials, soap operas back in Passione, the role of Jessica, a "new rich" spoiled, jealous and nymphomaniac. Considered by actress a "turning point" in her career, such a character received critical acclaim and the public, where also the second actress leaves the stigma of her character in For Love and ceases to be compared with her mother Regina.

In 2011, she participated in a new framework of the Fantástico, made especially for Father's Day, É Pai, É Pedra, playing Mônica on 4 episodes. In 2013, returns to cinema with comedy Mato sem Cachorro and will make a cameo on the soap opera Amor à Vida of Walcyr Carrasco.

In 2016, participated in the first phase of the novel A Lei do Amor, interpreting the mysterious Suzana when young and its mother, Regina, represented the same personage in the second phase of the plot. In 2018, Gabriela is cast for the cast of the novel Orgulho e Paixão, in the pamphlet the actress will play the villain Julieta, who is known as the Queen of the Coffee.

Personal life 

Daughter of actress Regina Duarte and businessman Marcos Flávio Cunha Franco. In 2002, she married the photographer Jairo Goldflus.

In 2006, was born her first daughter, Manuela, and on 17 December 2011, was born her first son, Frederico.

Filmography

Television

Films

Theater

References

External links 

1974 births
Living people
People from Campinas
Brazilian emigrants to the United States
Brazilian people of Portuguese descent
Brazilian television actresses
Brazilian telenovela actresses
Brazilian film actresses
Brazilian stage actresses